How Far Away, How Near is a 1972 film directed by Tadeusz Konwicki.

Plot

Andrzej, a forty-year-old man, is tormented both by post-war trauma and by suicidal death of his friend. He sets off on a symbolic journey through past, present, and future to meet ghosts of childhood friends, parents, first love, first wife.

See also
 Cinema of Poland
 List of Polish language films

External links
 

1972 films
1970s Polish-language films